Field hockey has been an African Games event since the fourth edition in 1987 in Nairobi, Kenya. It last featured on the games programme in 2003. It is set to return at the 2023 African Games in Accra, Ghana.

Men's tournament

Results

Summary

* = hosts

Team appearances

Women's tournament

Results

Summary

* = hosts

Team appearances

Medal table

Total

Men

Women

See also 
Men's African Olympic Qualifier
Men's Hockey Africa Cup of Nations
Women's African Olympic Qualifier
Women's Hockey Africa Cup of Nations

References

External links 
Field Hockey Africa Archive

 
All-Africa Games
Field hockey
African Games